Gary Cunningham (born August 28, 1950) is a Canadian retired professional ice hockey player. He played two games in the WHA with the Edmonton Oilers during the 1973–74 season.

External links
 

1950 births
Living people
Canadian ice hockey defencemen
Cape Cod Cubs (EHL) players
Edmonton Oilers (WHA) players
Ice hockey people from Ontario
Philadelphia Flyers draft picks
Quebec Aces (AHL) players
Richmond Robins players
St. Catharines Black Hawks players
Sportspeople from Welland
Victoria Cougars (WHL) coaches
Winston-Salem Polar Twins (SHL) players
Canadian ice hockey coaches